Jessica Anne Jordan Burton (born 6 May 1984) is a Bolivian-British politician, model and beauty pageant titleholder who was crowned Miss Bolivia 2007 and represented Bolivia at Miss Universe 2007 pageant in Mexico City.

Jessica is the only child of an English father and Bolivian mother, Aida Burton.  Her father, Andrew Keith Jordan is a petroleum engineer.  In addition to Bolivia, Jessica has also lived in England, Scotland, the US and Brazil.

In her youth Jessica was very interested in sport and traveling and her mother worried that she was a bit too 'tomboyish' and not 'girly' enough.  At about 16 years of age her mother enrolled her into modelling classes, which Jessica found she enjoyed. As a result, Jessica went on to participate in numerous fashion competitions in Europe the US and Mexico as well as having succeeded in many beauty competitions.  These include Miss Mundo Latina, which she won in Miami in 2003.   Jessica Jordan succeeded Desiree Durán who won the Miss Bolivia title in 2005, and Miss Bolivia Universe in 2006. In addition, she was crowned Reina Internacional del Café 2008.

Jessica had acquired an interest in politics from her mother and states that she always wanted to help her country.  Her beauty title gave her the opportunity to meet people of influence, which culminated in her meeting the country's president, Evo Morales.  President Morales invited Jessica to stand for governor in the very marginal constituency of Beni, in which the President's party Movimiento Al Socialismo (MAS) had previously lost by 25,000 votes.  Jessica did not win but obtained more than 60,000 votes, losing by 2,900 votes (having narrowed the gap).  She nonetheless obtained 40% of the votes.

After the election, the President asked Jordan to become the representative of the Agency for Macro-Regions and Border Zones (Agencia de las Macrorregiones y Zonas Fronterizas; Ademaf) in Beni. Critics say that this position puts her in competition with the elected governor. Jessica is responsible for a budget of US$700 million a year for Beni, to be spent on roads, nurseries, hospitals, etc.

In September 2012, the MAS renominated her as candidate for governor of Beni in the 2013 special election. Jordan was defeated by Carmelo Lens of the Beni First party, who won a 52.27% majority ahead of her second-place finish with 60,382 votes (44,35%).

Jessica is very influential young women in Bolivia is now General Consul of Bolivia in New York.

References

External links 

 Get Out! Site
 Photo gallery of Jessica Jordan as a  model and Miss Bolivia Universe 2007

1984 births
Living people
Miss Earth 2006 contestants
Miss Universe 2007 contestants
Movement for Socialism (Bolivia) politicians
People from Bath, Somerset
People from Beni Department
Bolivian beauty pageant winners
Bolivian people of English descent
British people of Bolivian descent
British emigrants to Bolivia
Bolivian female models
21st-century Bolivian women politicians
21st-century Bolivian politicians
Beauty queen-politicians
21st-century British women politicians